Indenone is a polycyclic ketone with chemical formula C9H6O.  It is composed of a benzene ring fused with a cyclopentenone ring. Indenones can be used as intermediates in the synthesis of more complex molecules.

See also 
 Indene
 Isoindenone

References

Indenes
Aromatic ketones